Dirk Willems (died 16 May 1569; also spelled Durk Willems) was a Dutch martyred Anabaptist who is most famous for escaping from prison but then turning back to rescue his pursuer—who had fallen through thin ice while chasing Willems—to then be recaptured, tortured and killed for his beliefs.

Life
Willems was born in Asperen, Gelderland, Netherlands. He was rebaptized (Anabaptist) as a young man in Rotterdam, thus rejecting the infant baptism practiced at that time by both Catholics and established Protestants in the Netherlands, which he would have received previously. This action, plus his continued devotion to his new faith and the baptism of several other people in his home, led to his condemnation by the Roman Catholic Church in the Netherlands and subsequent arrest in Asperen in 1569.

Willems was held in a residential palace turned into a prison, from which he escaped using a rope made out of knotted rags. Using this, he was able to climb out of the prison onto the frozen moat.  A guard noticed his escape and gave chase. Willems was able to traverse the thin ice of a frozen pond, the Hondegat, because of his lighter weight after subsisting on prison rations.  However, the pursuing guard fell through the ice and yelled for help as he struggled in the icy water. Willems turned back to save the life of his pursuer, and thus was recaptured. His erstwhile pursuer stated his desire to let Willems go, but the burgomaster "reminded the pursuer of his oath", causing the pursuer to seize Willems.

Willems was thereafter held until he was condemned by a group of seven judges, who, quoting Willems' "persisting obstinately in his opinion", ordered that he be burned at the stake on 16 May 1569, as well as that all his property be confiscated "for the benefit of his royal majesty". Willems was executed in Asperen, and with a strong eastward wind blowing that day, the fire was driven away from the condemned's upper body, thus prolonging his torturous death. It was reported that the wind carried his screams all the way to nearby Leerdam, where he was heard to have exclaimed things such as "O Lord; my God", etc., over seventy times. The bailiff on horseback nearby was so saddened by Willems' suffering that he said to the executioner, "Dispatch the man with a quick death." Though it isn't known if the executioner obeyed this request, it is known that Willems eventually died there, "with great steadfastness", and "having commended his soul into the hands of God".

Legacy 
Today, he is one of the most celebrated martyrs among Anabaptists, which includes Mennonites and Amish, as well as a folk hero among modern residents of Asperen. A historical drama based on his life—Dirk's Exodus—was written in 1989 by James C. Juhnke. In 2018, a statue of Dirk Willems was unveiled at the Mennonite Heritage Village museum in Steinbach, Manitoba.

References

External links
Martyrs Mirror entry
Dirk Willemsz (d. 1569) at Global Anabaptist Mennonite Encyclopedia Online

Year of birth unknown
1569 deaths
People from Lingewaal
16th-century Protestant martyrs
Dutch Anabaptists
Dutch Mennonites
Dutch Christian pacifists
Dutch escapees
Executed Dutch people
People executed by the Netherlands by burning
People executed for heresy